Northumberland County Council elections are held every four years. Northumberland County Council is the local authority for the unitary authority of Northumberland in England. Since the last boundary changes in 2013, 67 councillors have been elected from 66 wards.

Political control
Northumberland County Council was first created in 1889. Its powers and responsibilities were significantly reformed under the Local Government Act 1972, with a new council elected in 1973 to act as a shadow authority ahead of the new powers coming into force in 1974. It became a unitary authority in 2009, taking over the functions previously exercised by the county's district councils, which were abolished. Since 1973, political control of the council has been held by the following parties:

Non-metropolitan county

Unitary authority

Leadership
The leaders of the council since 2013 have been:

Council elections
1973 Northumberland County Council election
1977 Northumberland County Council election
1981 Northumberland County Council election
1985 Northumberland County Council election
1989 Northumberland County Council election
1993 Northumberland County Council election
1997 Northumberland County Council election
2001 Northumberland County Council election
2005 Northumberland County Council election
2008 Northumberland County Council election
2013 Northumberland County Council election
2017 Northumberland County Council election
2021 Northumberland County Council election

County result maps

By-election results

References

External links
Northumberland County Council

 
Council elections in Northumberland
Unitary authority elections in England